The 1982 All-Ireland Senior Hurling Championship Final was the 95th All-Ireland Final and the culmination of the 1982 All-Ireland Senior Hurling Championship, an inter-county hurling tournament for the top teams in Ireland. The match was held at Croke Park, Dublin, on 5 September 1982, between Kilkenny and Cork. The Munster champions lost to their Leinster opponents on a score line of 3-18 to 1-13.

All-Ireland Senior Hurling Championship Final
All-Ireland Senior Hurling Championship Final, 1982
All-Ireland Senior Hurling Championship Final
All-Ireland Senior Hurling Championship Finals
Cork county hurling team matches
Kilkenny GAA matches